Alessandro Giannessi was the defending champion but lost in the first round to Artem Smirnov.

Richard Gasquet won the title after defeating Florian Mayer 7–6(7–3), 7–6(7–4) in the final.

Seeds

Draw

Finals

Top half

Bottom half

References
Main Draw
Qualifying Draw

Pekao Szczecin Open - Singles
2017 Singles